Hereford Priory may refer to
Blackfriars, Hereford, Widemarsh Street
Saint Guthlac's Priory, between Bath Street and Commercial Road